Jozef Kostelník (born 14 September 1970) is a former football player from Slovakia and manager.

Honours

Manager
FK Senica
Slovak Cup:  Runners-Up 2015

External links
 1. FC Tatran Prešov profile

References

1970 births
Living people
Slovak footballers
Slovak football managers
1. FC Tatran Prešov players
FK Dukla Prague players
AC Sparta Prague players
SK Dynamo České Budějovice players
FC Hradec Králové players
MŠK Žilina players
Hapoel Jerusalem F.C. players
FK Čaňa players
Slovak Super Liga players
Czech First League players
1. FC Tatran Prešov managers
FK Senica managers
MFK Tatran Liptovský Mikuláš managers
MFK Skalica managers
MFK Vranov nad Topľou managers
ŠK Odeva Lipany managers
TJ Baník Ružiná managers
Sandecja Nowy Sącz managers
Expatriate footballers in the Czech Republic
Slovak expatriate sportspeople in the Czech Republic
Expatriate footballers in Israel
Slovak expatriate sportspeople in Israel
Expatriate football managers in Poland
Slovak expatriate sportspeople in Poland
Association football midfielders
Sportspeople from Prešov